Charles Pierce House is a historic home located the hamlet of Oak Hill in the town of Durham in Greene County, New York.  It was built about 1840 and is a two-story, five-by-two-bay, central-hall, double-pile plan frame dwelling.  It features a full two-story porch supported by 4 two-story fluted Ionic columns in the Greek Revival style.

It was listed on the National Register of Historic Places in 2001.

See also
National Register of Historic Places listings in Greene County, New York

References

Houses on the National Register of Historic Places in New York (state)
Houses completed in 1840
Houses in Greene County, New York
National Register of Historic Places in Greene County, New York